Viktoria Boykova (born 5 January 1989) is a Russian wheelchair fencer, who won silver in the women's épée B event at the 2020 Summer Paralympics.

References

1989 births
Living people
Russian female épée fencers
Wheelchair fencers at the 2020 Summer Paralympics
Medalists at the 2020 Summer Paralympics
Paralympic silver medalists for the Russian Paralympic Committee athletes
Paralympic bronze medalists for the Russian Paralympic Committee athletes
Paralympic medalists in wheelchair fencing
Paralympic wheelchair fencers of Russia
21st-century Russian women